Laplace's approximation provides an analytical expression for a posterior probability distribution by fitting a Gaussian distribution with a mean equal to the MAP solution and a variance equal to the observed Fisher information. The approximation is justified by the Bernstein–von Mises theorem, which states that under regularity conditions the posterior converges to a Gaussian in large samples.

For example, a (possibly non-linear) regression or classification model with data set  comprising inputs  and outputs  has (unknown) parameter vector  of length . The likelihood is denoted  and the parameter prior . The joint density of outputs and parameters  is the object of inferential desire

The joint is equal to the product of the likelihood and the prior and by Bayes' rule, equal to the product of the marginal likelihood  and posterior . Seen as a function of  the joint is an un-normalised density. Laplace's approximation is

where we have defined

Thus, the Gaussian approximation matches the value and the curvature of the un-normalised target density at the mode. Newton's method. In summary, we have

In the special case of Bayesian linear regression with a Gaussian prior, the approximation is exact. The main weaknesses of Laplace's approximation are that it is symmetric around the mode and that it is very local: the entire approximation is derived from properties at a single point of the target density. Laplace's method is widely used and was pioneered in the context of neural networks by David MacKay, and for Gaussian processes by Williams and Barber.

References 

Statistical approximations
Bayesian inference